William Fawcett was the name of two paddle steamers that operated in British waters from the late 1820s into the mid-1840s. The first ship, built in 1828, is generally recognized as the first ship in the service of what became the Peninsular and Oriental Steam Navigation Company (P&O).

1828 ship 
In 1828, William Fawcett of Liverpool and Joseph Robinson Pim of Dublin commissioned the construction of a paddle steamer named William Fawcett. The ship was built by Caleb and James Smith at the Queen's Dock, Port of Liverpool. The firm of Fawcett, Preston and Company, of which William Fawcett was part-owner and manager, provided the steam engines, rated at 130 horsepower, for the ship. The ship was employed in the packet trade between London, Cork and Dublin. The ship was sold to Richard Bourne and associates in 1832 for service with the Dublin and London Steam Packet Company.

In 1835 Bourne partnered with Brodie McGhie Willcox and Arthur Anderson to charter the William Fawcett for five voyages between London and the Iberian Peninsula. This service is regarded as the beginning of the Peninsular Steam Navigation Company, which later became the P&O. The first four trips of the William Fawcett for the Peninsular company in 1835 turned around at Lisbon. The fifth trip reached Gibraltar. In 1837 and again in early 1838, the ship was chartered by the Peninsular company for a trip from London to northern Spain and return. The ship was refitted later in 1838, and afterwards chartered by the Peninsular company for two trips between London and Madeira. The William Fawcett had been broken up by April 1845.

1829 ship 
The second William Fawcett was a paddle steamer built in 1829 in Liverpool by Mottershead and Hayes. It had a 26 (or 30) horsepower engine supplied by Fawcett, Preston and Company. The ship worked as a ferry between Liverpool and Birkenhead for at least twenty years.

Notes 

P&O (company)
Paddle steamers of the United Kingdom
Mersey Ferries